Delek US Holdings, Inc. is a diversified downstream energy company with assets in petroleum refining, logistics, asphalt, renewable fuels and convenience store retailing headquartered in Brentwood, Tennessee.

The company has a broad platform consisting of:

 A refining system with approximately 300,000 barrels per day of crude throughput capacity consisting of four locations and an integrated retail platform that includes approximately 300 locations serving central and west Texas and New Mexico.
 Logistics operations including Delek Logistics, which can benefit from future drop downs and organic projects to support a larger refining system. 
 A marketing operation that supplies more than 350 wholesale locations, has unbranded wholesale sales of approximately 145,000 barrels per day of light products in 13 states, and has utilization of 450,000 barrels per month of space on the Colonial Pipeline System. 
 An integrated asphalt business consisting of operations primarily in Texas, Arkansas, Oklahoma, California and Washington approaching 1 million tons of sales on an annual basis.

Operations

Refining
 Delek's refining segment owns and operates four inland refineries with a combined crude throughput capacity of 302,000 barrels per day. The refineries are located in Tyler, Texas; Big Spring, Texas; Krotz Springs, Louisiana; and El Dorado, Arkansas.
 Delek's system processes primarily light crude oil sourced from the Permian Basin, East Texas, Gulf Coast and local production near Delek's refinery locations. In the past two years, Delek has doubled its refining capacity and gained a large presence in the Permian Basin.

Logistics
 Delek's logistics segment gathers, transports, and stores crude oil, as well as markets, distributes, transports and stores refined product in West Texas and the Southeast U.S. These operations serve as the logistics arm of Delek's company, primarily providing support for Delek's refining operations, while also serving third parties.

Retail
 Delek's fuel brands are DK and ALON.

Renewables
 There is increased demand projected for biodiesel, and Delek's three biodiesel plants serve as strong assets in a growing renewable industry.
 Delek's plants are capable of producing approximately 40 million gallons of biodiesel a year.
 Located in Cleburne, Texas, Crossett, Arkansas, and New Albany, Mississippi. 
 Delek Renewables utilizes a wide variety of waste stream feedstocks in used cooking oil, poultry fat, beef tallow, and choice white grease (hog fat) as well as vegetable oils such as soybean and canola oil.

History

Since 2001, the Company has completed multiple acquisitions in the refining, marketing & logistics, and convenience store industries.

Today, Delek is a diversified downstream energy company with assets in petroleum refining, logistics, asphalt, renewable fuels, and convenience store retailing. Key events in its history are summarized below:

Acquisitions/Divestitures
 May 2001: Acquired MAPCO Express, Inc., with 198 retail fuel and convenience stores
 April 2005: Acquired the Tyler Refinery and its related assets
 July 2006: Acquired of 40 Retail Fuel and Convenience Stores From Fast Petroleum
 August 2006: Acquired of Refining Equipment, Pipelines, Storage Tanks and Terminals From Pride Companies
 October 2011: Acquired sole ownership of Lion Oil Company, with a refinery, pipeline and other refining, product terminal, and crude oil pipeline assets in and around El Dorado, Arkansas, and product terminals in Memphis and Nashville, Tennessee
 January 2013: Announced Agreement to Purchase a Biodiesel Facility in Cleburne,Texas from EQM Technologies & Energy, Inc.
 February 2014: Announced Agreement to Purchase a Biodiesel Facility in Crossett, Arkansas
 November 2016: Completed Sale of MAPCO Retail Related Assets for $535 million
 March 2018: Sold refineries in Paramount, California and Long Beach, California to World Energy LLC.
 November 2018: Announced Big Spring Crude Oil Gathering System in the Permian Basin
 May 2019: Acquired 33% Interest in Red River pipeline joint venture
 August 2019: Acquired 15% Interest in Wink to Webster Pipeline LLC
 November 2019: Announced Agreement to Purchase a Biodiesel Facility in New Albany, Mississippi
 May 2020: Sold Bakersfield Refinery to Global Clean Energy Holdings
 June 2022: Acquired 3Bear Energy through Delek's master limited partnership, Delek Logistics Partners, LP.  3Bear's operations included crude oil and gas gathering, processing and transportation businesses, as well as water disposal and recycling operations in the Delaware Basin in New Mexico.

Mergers
 May 2015: Acquired 33.7 million shares of common stock of Alon USA Energy, Inc. This represented approximately 48% of Alon USA shares outstanding in May 2015
 July 2017: Acquired the remaining shares of common stock of Alon USA Energy, Inc. Operations included refining, retail, asphalt, and renewable fuel, including Paramount Petroleum.

References

External links

Companies listed on the New York Stock Exchange
Oil companies of the United States
American subsidiaries of foreign companies
Companies based in Tennessee
2006 initial public offerings
Williamson County, Tennessee